Carinonautilus is a genus of extinct, Middle Cretaceous nautilid with a very involute, compressed shell in which the whorl section is higher than wide, umbilicus is small and shallow, or flanks converge on a narrow venter that has a rounded keel.  A furrow on either side marks the ventro-lateral shoulder.

The genus was erected by Spengler in 1910 on the basis of the holotype, found in Middle Cretaceous strata from India.

References

 Bernard Kummel, 1964. Nautiloidea -Nautilida.Treatise on Invertebrate Paleontology, Part K. Geological Society of America and University of Kansas Press.

Prehistoric nautiloid genera
Aptian genus first appearances
Santonian genus extinctions